Gladson do Nascimento (born 26 January 1986), commonly known as Edgar, is a Brazilian professional footballer. He currently plays for Remo as a striker.

External links
 Edgar at playmakerstats.com (English version of ogol.com.br)

Living people
1986 births
Brazilian footballers
Association football forwards
Clube do Remo players
Sampaio Corrêa Futebol Clube players
Horizonte Futebol Clube players